Eric Berthel (born March 28, 1967) is an American politician and a Republican member of the Connecticut Senate, representing the 32nd District since 2017.

Berthel has been the State Senator for the 32nd Senate District since 2017, representing part of the Naugatuck River Valley and Litchfield County in the Connecticut Senate, including the towns of Bethlehem, Bridgewater, Middlebury (part), Oxford, Roxbury, Seymour (part), Southbury, Washington, Watertown, and Woodbury.

Berthel is the Vice Chair of the Insurance & Real Estate and the Banking Committees. He has also served on the public health, education, finance, appropriations and judiciary committees during his time in the legislature in both the State House and the State Senate. He previously served on the Watertown, Connecticut Public Schools Board of Education as Vice-Chairman.

Berthel considered a run for the open congressional seat in Connecticut's 5th congressional district in 2018, but ultimately decided not to run, instead seeking reelection to the state Senate.

In September 2020, Berthel's car was photographed with a window sticker supporting QAnon, a right-wing movement promoting baseless conspiracy theories. After the sticker came to attention on social media, Berthel initially defended the QAnon conspiracy theory by contending that it has "inspired more people to participate in policy and government." Later that month, Berthel apologized, saying, "My failure to look into the movement more deeply, which I take full responsibility for, led me to overlook the extreme views of the movement which I don’t subscribe to and find abhorrent. It was my lack of fully understanding this movement that led me to put these words on my car for which I deeply regret." Berthel's Democratic opponent Jeff Desmarais called Berthel's conduct "disqualifying" but Berthel nevertheless won a third term in the November 2020 election.

References

1967 births
American conspiracy theorists
Living people
People from Watertown, Connecticut
Manhattanville College alumni
University of Bridgeport alumni
Republican Party members of the Connecticut House of Representatives
Republican Party Connecticut state senators
21st-century American politicians